Ireland Eliesse Baldwin (born October 23, 1995), also known as Ireland Basinger Baldwin, is an American fashion model. Baldwin started modeling and acting in 2013 and  appeared in the film Grudge Match and in editorials for magazines such as Grazia. Baldwin is also a vocal advocate for animal rights and posed for PETA 24 years after her mother did.

Early life
Baldwin was born in Los Angeles to actors Alec Baldwin and Kim Basinger. She is also the niece of actors Stephen, Daniel, and William Baldwin and cousin to model Hailey Bieber. She has three younger half-sisters: Carmen, Lucia, and Ilaria; as well as four half-brothers: Rafael, Leonardo, Romeo, and Eduardo; through her father's second marriage.

At age 11 in 2007, she gained attention in the media after her father left her an angry voicemail message, which became publicized. He stated that she was "a rude, thoughtless little pig".

Career
Baldwin signed with IMG Models in March 2013. In April, she made her modeling debut in a swimwear editorial for the New York Post. In May, Baldwin appeared in W Magazines It Trend, It Girl feature. Baldwin was Vanity Fairs It Girl in June, photographed by Patrick Demarchelier. Her first magazine cover appearance was for Modern Luxury's second issue of Beach in July, appearing in a white bikini. Elle interviewed Baldwin in its September 2013 issue. The editorial accompanying the interview was photographed by Thomas Whiteside and styled by Joe Zee. She appeared in an editorial for DuJour magazine, photographed by Bruce Weber. Baldwin made her acting debut in the film Grudge Match, playing a younger version of Kim Basinger's character, Sally.

In 2014 Baldwin began studying at the New York Film Academy, mainly cinematography and acting. She attended the 86th Academy Awards alongside Nancy O'Dell and Joe Zee as media correspondents for Entertainment Tonight.

In April 2015 Baldwin resigned from IMG after a stint in rehab. She signed with DT Model Management in June 2015.

In 2017, Baldwin appeared in campaigns for True Religion Jeans and Guess. In May, she appeared on the covers of Elle Bulgaria, L'Officiel Ukraine and Marie Claire Mexico. Baldwin appeared in the film Campus Caller as the main character, Macey Duncan.

In 2018, she posed nude for a PETA "I'd Rather Go Naked Than Wear Fur" anti-fur ad campaign, 24 years after her mother did the same. The promotional video for the piece featured Baldwin stating that she has a "no fur" policy in her contract. In September, Baldwin appeared on the cover of Grazia, shot by Yu Tsai.

In 2019, Baldwin was hired to DJ alongside Caroline D'Amore for the Norah restaurant's 3rd anniversary. She said she was "Definitely not a full time DJ". In September, Baldwin was hired to DJ at Smile Train's annual Pool Party charity event. She also appeared in the Comedy Central Roast of her father Alec, doing an unannounced routine.

Personal life
In 2014, Baldwin was in a relationship with rapper Angel Haze. In 2015, Haze devoted their track "Candlxs" to Baldwin; the cover art depicting Baldwin and Haze was painted by Haze. Several months later Baldwin ended the relationship before checking herself into Malibu's Soba Recovery Center for "emotional trauma".

In 2018, she began dating musician Corey Harper.

In 2019, Baldwin revealed in an Instagram story about the Human Life Protection Act that she was a victim of sexual assault. In the story, she said that she is a survivor and that "one day [she] will reveal the true story". She also revealed that at the time, she began to rely on substances, resulting in what she characterized as "sabotaging" her career. In 2022, she expanded on that story on TikTok, saying she was raped as a teenager while she was unconscious. She also wrote that she had an abortion in an unrelated incident, "because I know exactly what it felt like to be born to two people who hated each other", so she opposes the Dobbs v. Jackson Women's Health Organization decision.

Baldwin has been in a relationship with the musician Andre Allen Anjos, better known as RAC, since 2021. On December 31, 2022, she announced on Instagram that the couple are expecting their first child together.

References

External links
 
 
 
 "Candlxs" on Spotify

1995 births
American people of English descent
American people of French descent
American people of Irish descent
Ireland
Female models from California
LGBT models
LGBT people from California
Living people
Models from Los Angeles
Sierra Canyon School alumni
American female models